Septimius (or Septiminus) was a Roman usurper who was proclaimed Emperor in either 271 or 272 AD, under the reign of Aurelian.

History
Septimius declared himself emperor in either 271 or 272 AD, in Dalmatia, during the reign of Aurelian. The reason for his rebellion is not strictly known, although the threat of Gothic invasion may have played a part. He was killed by his own troops soon afterward.

References

Books

External links
 S.v. "Aurelian", De Imperatoribus Romanis site

271 deaths
3rd-century Roman usurpers
3rd-century murdered monarchs
Murdered Roman emperors
Year of birth unknown